Rhinella dapsilis is a species of toad in the family Bufonidae.
It is found in Brazil, Colombia, Ecuador, and Peru.
Its natural habitats are subtropical or tropical moist lowland forests, rivers, freshwater marshes, and intermittent freshwater marshes.

References

dapsilis
Amphibians of Brazil
Amphibians of Colombia
Amphibians of Ecuador
Amphibians of Peru
Amphibians described in 1945
Taxa named by George S. Myers
Taxa named by Antenor Leitão de Carvalho
Taxonomy articles created by Polbot